Commissario Laurenti is a German television series, with five episodes broadcast 2006–2009, based on the crime novels by Veit Heinichen. It was filmed on location in Trieste, Italy.

The episodes are:
 Gib jedem seinen eigenen Tod (2006)
 Die Toten vom Karst (2006)
 Tod auf der Warteliste (2007)
 Der Tod wirft lange Schatten (2008)
 Totentanz (2009)

Series Cast  
 Henry Hübchen as Commissario Proteo Laurenti  appears in 5 episodes, 2006-2009 
 Barbara Rudnik as Laura Laurenti appears in 5 episodes, 2006-2009 
 Sergej Moya as Marco Laurenti appears in 5 episodes, 2006-2009 
 Florian Panzner as Antonio Sgubin appears in 5 episodes, 2006-2009 
 Sophia Thomalla as Livia Laurenti appears in 5 episodes, 2006-2009 
 Catherine Flemming as Marietta appears in 5 episodes, 2006-2009 
 Rolf Hoppe as Galvano appears in 3 episodes, 2007-2009 
 Johannes Silberschneider as Scoglio appears in 3 episodes, 2007-2009 
 Christopher Buchholz as Drakic appears in 3 episodes, 2007-2009 
 Horst Krause as Questore appears in 2 episodes, 2007-2008 
  as Dr. Ziva Ravno appears in 2 episodes, 2006-2009 
 August Schmölzer as Orlando appears in 2 episodes, 2006

See also
 List of German television series

References

External links
 

German crime television series
2000s German police procedural television series
2006 German television series debuts
2009 German television series endings
Television shows set in Italy
German-language television shows
Das Erste original programming
Trieste in fiction